Love Story is a 2008 Bengali film, directed by Raj Mukherjee. The film featured Angsuman Parashar and Barsha Priyadarshini.

Plot
The story is about Saheb and Nandini who are born in the same nursing home on the same day. But circumstances drive Saheb into the home of an untouchable dom who works in a crematorium while Nandini is brought up in an affluent home. By chance, one day Saheb comes to Nandini's house in connection with some painting job. The two fall in love and naturally, Nandini's father is not happy about it at all.

References

External links
Love Story on Banglalovestory.in

2008 films
2000s Bengali-language films
Bengali-language Indian films